The Belmeken Hydro Power Plant is an active pumped storage hydro power project in the eastern Rila mountains, Bulgaria. It is part of the Belmeken-Chaira-Sestrimo Hydropower Cascade.

References

Pumped-storage hydroelectric power stations in Bulgaria
Hydroelectric power stations in Bulgaria
Buildings and structures in Pazardzhik Province